General elections were held in India between 25 October 1951 and 21 February 1952. They were the first elections to the Lok Sabha after independence on 15 August 1947. It was conducted under the provisions of the Indian Constitution, which was adopted on 26 November 1949. Elections to most of the state legislatures took place simultaneously.

A total of 1,949 candidates competed for 489 seats in the Lok Sabha. More than 173 million people out of an overall population of about 360 million were eligible to vote, making it the largest election conducted at the time. Voter turnout was 45.7%.

The Indian National Congress (INC) won a landslide victory, winning 364 of the 489 seats and 45% of the total votes polled. This was over four times as many votes as the second-largest party. Jawaharlal Nehru became the first democratically elected Prime Minister of the country.

After the adoption of the constitution on 26 November 1949, the Constituent Assembly continued to act as the interim parliament. The interim cabinet was headed by Jawaharlal Nehru and consisted of 15 members from diverse communities and parties. Various members of this cabinet resigned from their posts and formed their own parties to contest the elections.

A total of 173,212,343	voters were registered (excluding Jammu and Kashmir) out of a population of 361,088,090 according to the 1951 Census of India. All Indian citizens over the age of 21 were eligible to vote.

Each candidate was allotted a differently-coloured ballot box at the polling booth, on which each candidate's name and symbol were written. 16,500 clerks were appointed on a contract of six months to type and collate the electorate rolls and 380,000 reams of paper were used for printing the rolls.

Due to the harsh climate and challenging logistics, the election was held in 68 phases. A total of 196,084 polling booths were set up, of which 27,527 booths were reserved for women. All states except Himachal Pradesh and Jammu & Kashmir voted in February–March 1952; no polls were held for Lok Sabha seats in Kashmir until 1967. Himachal Pradesh voted in 1951 for the first Lok Sabha; the weather there tends to be inclement in February and March, heavy snow impending free movement. The first votes of the election were cast in the tehsil (district) of Chini in Himachal Pradesh.

Voters elected 489 members to the lower house of the Parliament of India. These were allotted across 401 constituencies in 25 Indian states. There were 314 constituencies electing one member using the first-past-the-post system. 86 constituencies elected two members, one from the general category and one from Scheduled Castes or Scheduled Tribes. There was one constituency with three elected representatives. These multi-seat constituencies were present to fulfill the reservations granted to backward sections of the society by the Constitution. They were later abolished in the 1960s.

The Constitution at this time also provided for two Anglo-Indian members to be nominated by the President of India.

Political parties
A total of 53 parties and 533 independents contested the 489 seats in the election. Two former cabinet colleagues of Nehru established separate political parties to challenge the INC's supremacy. While Syama Prasad Mukherjee went on to found the Jana Sangh in October 1951, first Law Minister B. R. Ambedkar revived the Scheduled Castes Federation (which was later named the Republican Party).

Other parties which started coming to the forefront included the Kisan Mazdoor Praja Parishad, whose prime mover was Acharya Kripalani; the Socialist Party, which had Ram Manohar Lohia and Jayaprakash Narayan's leadership to boast of; and the Communist Party of India. However, these smaller parties were unable to make an electoral stand against the Indian National Congress.

Results

Results by state

Government formation
The speaker of the first Lok Sabha was Ganesh Vasudev Mavalankar. The first Lok Sabha also witnessed 677 sittings (3,784 hours), the highest recorded count of the number of sitting hours. The Lok Sabha lasted its full term from 17 April 1952 until 4 April 1957.

Notable losses
First Law Minister B. R. Ambedkar was defeated in the Bombay (North Central) (reserved seat) constituency as Scheduled Castes Federation candidate by his little-known former assistant and Congress Candidate Narayan Sadoba Kajrolkar, who polled 1,38,137 votes compared to Ambedkar's 1,23,576 votes. Ambedkar then entered the parliament as a Rajya Sabha member. He contested a by-poll from Bhandara in 1954 in another attempt to enter the Lok Sabha, but again lost to Borkar of Congress.

Acharya Kripalani lost from Faizabad in Uttar Pradesh as a KMPP candidate, but his wife Sucheta Kripalani defeated the Congress candidate Manmohini Sahgal in Delhi.

See also
Election Commission of India
1952 Indian presidential election

References

Further reading
Guha, Ramachandra. "Democracy's Biggest Gamble", World Policy Journal, (Spring 2002) 19#1 pp. 95–103

 
India
General elections in India